The 2019–20 season was Celtic's 131st season of competitive football. They competed in the Scottish Premiership, League Cup, Scottish Cup, Champions League and Europa League. Celtic won all three domestic tournaments, completing an unprecedented quadruple treble.

On 13 March 2020, the Scottish football season was suspended with immediate effect due to the COVID-19 pandemic. The season was curtailed as a result, with Celtic declared Scottish Premiership champions on 18 May, winning a ninth consecutive league title.

Pre-season and friendlies
Celtic held its pre-season training camp in Stegersbach (Austria) and St. Gallen (Switzerland), with matches against SC Pinkafeld, Wiener SC and St. Gallen.

Scottish Premiership

The Scottish Premiership fixture list was announced on 21 June 2019. Celtic began their title defence against St Johnstone at Celtic Park.

Scottish League Cup

On 28 July, Celtic were drawn to face Dunfermline Athletic at Celtic Park in the second round of the 2019–20 Scottish League Cup. The League Cup holders progressed to the quarter-finals with a 2–1 victory in extra-time. On 18 August, Celtic were drawn to face Partick Thistle at Celtic Park in the quarter-finals. The Bhoys' trophy defence continued with a five-goal win against the Championship side. On 25 September, Celtic were drawn to face Hibernian in the semi-finals. Goals from Mohamed Elyounoussi, Callum McGregor and Scott Brown secured Celtic's place in the final, a fourth consecutive League Cup final and seventh consecutive domestic cup final. On 8 December, Celtic won the Scottish League Cup for the fourth consecutive season, defeating Rangers 1–0 in the final.

Scottish Cup

On 24 November, Celtic were drawn to face Partick Thistle at Firhill Stadium in the fourth round of the 2019–20 Scottish Cup. The Scottish Cup holders progressed to the fifth round with a 2–1 victory. On 19 January 2020, Celtic were drawn to face Clyde at Broadwood Stadium in the fifth round. Goals from Olivier Ntcham, Scott Brown and Vakoun Issouf Bayo sealed Celtic's place in the quarter-finals. On 9 February, Celtic were drawn to face St Johnstone at McDiarmid Park in the quarter-finals. A late Ryan Christie free-kick secured Celtic's place in the semi-finals. On 1 March, Celtic were drawn to face Aberdeen in the semi-finals. As a result of the COVID-19 pandemic and subsequent suspension of Scottish football, the semi-finals were rescheduled for later in the year.

UEFA Champions League

Celtic entered the Champions League at the first qualifying round.

First qualifying round
On 18 June, Celtic were drawn to face Sarajevo (Bosnia and Herzegovina) in the first qualifying round of the UEFA Champions League. The Bhoys won 5–2 on aggregate and secured a place in the next round.

Second qualifying round
On 17 July, it was determined that Celtic would face Nõmme Kalju (Estonia) in the second qualifying round of the UEFA Champions League. The Scottish champions progressed to the third round with a 7–0 aggregate win against the Estonians.

Third qualifying round
On 30 July, it was determined that Celtic would face CFR Cluj (Romania) in the third qualifying round of the UEFA Champions League. The Bhoys were eliminated following a 5–4 aggregate defeat and parachuted into the UEFA Europa League play-off round.

UEFA Europa League

Play-off round
On 15 August, it was determined that Celtic would face AIK (Sweden) in the play-off round of the UEFA Europa League. Neil Lennon's side recorded a comfortable 6–1 win on aggregate and secured a place in the 2019–20 UEFA Europa League group stage.

Group stage
On 30 August, the draw for the 2019–20 UEFA Europa League group stage was made. Celtic were drawn in Group E along with Lazio (Pot 1), Rennes (Pot 3) and CFR Cluj (Pot 4).

Group E

Matches

Round of 32
On 16 December, Celtic were drawn to face Copenhagen in the 2019–20 UEFA Europa League Round of 32.

Statistics

Appearances and goals

|-
! colspan=16 style=background:#dcdcdc; text-align:center| Goalkeepers
|-

|-
! colspan=16 style=background:#dcdcdc; text-align:center| Defenders
|-

|-
! colspan=16 style=background:#dcdcdc; text-align:center| Midfielders
|-

|-
! colspan=16 style=background:#dcdcdc; text-align:center| Forwards
|-

|-
! colspan=16 style=background:#dcdcdc; text-align:center| Departures
|-

|-
! colspan=16 style=background:#dcdcdc; text-align:center| Signed in 2020–21
|-

|}

Notes

Goalscorers

Last updated: 20 December 2020

Disciplinary record
Includes all competitive matches. Players listed below made at least one appearance for Celtic first squad during the season.

Hat-tricks

(H) – Home; (A) – Away; (N) – Neutral

Clean sheets
As of 20 December 2020.

Attendances

Team statistics

League table

Competition overview

Results by round

Club

Technical staff

Kit
Supplier: New Balance / Sponsors: Dafabet (front) and Magners (back)

The club is in the fifth year of a deal with manufacturer New Balance.

Home: The home kit features the club's traditional green and white hoops, with a green polo-style collar. White shorts and predominantly green socks complete the look.
Away: The away kit features a lemon chrome shirt, with deep teal green shoulders. The shirt is accompanied by deep teal shorts and lemon chrome socks.
Third: The third kit features a grey shirt, with a berry chevron on the front, a design that was first used on a Celtic shirt one hundred years before. Grey and berry shorts and socks complete the look.

Transfers

In

Out

See also
 List of Celtic F.C. seasons

References

Celtic F.C. seasons
Celtic
Celtic
Celtic
Scottish football championship-winning seasons